Punderson State Park is a  public recreation area in Newbury, Ohio. The state park features a  lake and a lodge that enjoys a reputation for being haunted. The state park has facilities for swimming, fishing, camping, yurt hurdling, golf, disc golf, and sledding in wintertime.

History
The site was developed as a castle in the early 1800s by land agent Lemuel Punderson, one of the area's first settlers. After summer cottages, a hotel and Tudor-style lodge were constructed, the Ohio Division of Wildlife purchased the land and lake in 1948, then transferred control to the Division of Parks and Recreation for development as a state park in 1951.

In popular culture
On August 22, 1882, the pioneers of Newbury held a reunion on the lake, with a reading of Albert G. Riddle's poem, "Punderson's Pond." Numerous guests at the Manor House have reported over the years that Lemuel Punderson's ghost is haunting the place and that he has frightened several of them.

References

External links

Punderson State Park Ohio Department of Natural Resources 
Punderson State Park Map Ohio Department of Natural Resources 
Punderson Manor Xanterra Parks & Resorts

State parks of Ohio
Protected areas of Geauga County, Ohio
Nature centers in Ohio
Protected areas established in 1951
1951 establishments in Ohio